The Mullsjö Folk High School is a folk high school in Mullsjö, Sweden. It was established in 1949 in Jönköping and moved over to Mullsjö in 1950. The school is run by a foundation consisting of the Swedish Alliance Mission, its youth association and "Mullsjö folkhögskolas Kamratförbund".

References

External links
Mullsjö Folk High School 

1949 establishments in Sweden
Educational institutions established in 1949
Folk high schools in Sweden
Mullsjö
Buildings and structures in Mullsjö Municipality